A majority, also called a simple majority or absolute majority to distinguish it from related terms, is more than half of the total. It is a subset of a set consisting of more than half of the set's elements. For example, if a group consists of 20 individuals, a majority would be 11 or more individuals, while having 10 or fewer individuals would not constitute a majority. "Majority" can be used to specify the voting requirement, as in a "majority vote", which means more than half of the votes cast.

A majority can be compared to a plurality (sometimes called relative majority), which is a subset larger than any other subset but not necessarily larger than all other subsets combined, and not necessarily greater than half of the set. For example, if there is a group with 20 members which is divided into subgroups with 9, 6, and 5 members, then the 9-member group would be the plurality. A plurality is not necessarily a majority as the largest subset considered may consist of less than half the set's elements. This can occur when there are three or more possible choices. The (absolute) majority is sometimes referred to as a "simple" majority, compared to a supermajority (a majority requirement above 50%, like a 2/3 requirement), however use of this term is inconsistent as it sometimes refers to a mere plurality (as opposed to an absolute majority).

In British English the term "majority" is also alternatively used to refer to the winning margin, i.e., the number of votes separating the first-place finisher from the second-place finisher. Other related terms containing the word "majority" have their own meanings, which may sometimes be inconsistent in usage.

Majority vote 
In parliamentary procedure, the term "majority" simply means "more than half."  As it relates to a vote, a majority vote is more than half of the votes cast. Abstentions or blanks are excluded in calculating a majority vote. Also, the totals do not include votes cast by someone not entitled to vote or improper multiple votes by a single member.

Depending on the parliamentary authority used, there may be a difference in the total that is used to calculate a majority vote due to "illegal votes". Illegal votes are votes which are cast for unidentifiable or ineligible candidates or choices. In this definition, "illegal" refers to the choices made on the ballot and does not refer to the persons who cast the votes (i.e. the persons are eligible to vote).

In Robert's Rules of Order Newly Revised (abbreviated RONR), illegal votes are counted as votes cast, but are not credited to any candidate. In The Standard Code of Parliamentary Procedure (abbreviated TSC), illegal votes are not included in the total and a majority vote is defined as being more than half of all eligible votes cast. The issue of "illegal votes" does not exist when only two options are possible (e.g. "yes" or "no"), such as when a majority vote is required to adopt a proposal (motion). In this context, a majority vote is more "yes" votes than "no" votes.

A majority vote is not the same as a vote of a "majority of the members present" or a vote of a "majority of the entire membership".

Examples 
For example, assume that votes are cast for three people for an office: Alice, Bob, and Carol.

Scenario 1 

In Scenario 1, Alice received a majority vote. There were 20 votes cast and Alice received more than half of them.

Scenario 2 

In Scenario 2, assume all three candidates are eligible. In this case, no one received a majority vote. This example also illustrates that half the votes cast is not a majority vote.

Scenario 3 

In Scenario 3, assume that Alice and Bob are eligible candidates, but Carol is not. Using Robert's Rules of Order, no one received a majority vote, which is the same as Scenario 2. In this case, the 4 votes for Carol are counted in the total, but are not credited to Carol (which precludes the possibility of an ineligible candidate being credited with receiving a majority vote). However, using The Standard Code, Alice received a majority vote since only votes for eligible candidates are counted using this book. In this case, there are 16 votes for eligible candidates and Alice received more than half of those 16 votes.

Comparison to plurality 
In all three scenarios, Alice received a plurality, or the most votes among the candidates. However, only in Scenario 1 did Alice receive a majority vote using Robert's Rules of Order.

Related terms 
Other related terms containing the word "majority" have their own meanings, which may sometimes be inconsistent in usage.

A majority may sometimes be called a "simple majority" to contrast with other terms using "majority". A "simple majority" may also mean a "relative majority", or a plurality. These two definitions would conflict when a "simple majority" (i.e. plurality) is not a "majority" (also see the disambiguation page for simple majority).

An "absolute majority" may mean a majority of all electors, not just those who voted. This usage would be equivalent to a "majority of the entire membership". However, the definition for "absolute majority" is not consistent, as it could also mean the same as "majority" or "simple majority". The meanings for "absolute majority" and "simple majority" would have to be determined from the context in which these terms are used.

A "supermajority", or a "qualified majority", is a specified higher threshold than one half. A common use of a supermajority is a "two-thirds vote", which is sometimes referred to as a "two-thirds majority".

In parliamentary systems, an "overall majority" is the difference of legislators between the government and its opposition. In this context, the term "majority" could be also alternatively used to refer to the winning margin, i.e. the number of votes separating the first-place finisher from the second-place finisher.

A "double majority" is a voting system which requires a majority of votes according to two separate criteria.

Temporary majority 
A temporary majority exists when the positions of the members present and voting in a meeting of a deliberative assembly on a subject are not representative of the membership as a whole. Parliamentary procedure contains some provisions designed to protect against a temporary majority violating the rights of absentees. For instance, previous notice is required to rescind, repeal or annul or amend something previously adopted by a majority vote; if previous notice has not been given, a two-thirds vote is required. However, in this and many other cases, previous notice is not required if a majority of the entire membership votes in favor, because that indicates that it is clearly not a temporary majority. Another protection against a decision being made by a temporary majority is the motion to reconsider and enter on the minutes, by which two members can suspend action on a measure until it is called up at a meeting on another day.

Application in other voting requirements 
"Majority" could be specified with respect to the voting body.

"Majority of the entire membership" and "majority of the fixed membership" 
A "majority of the entire membership" means more than half of all the members of a body. A "majority of the fixed membership" means more than half of all the seats of a body. A majority of the entire membership is different from a majority of the fixed membership when there are vacancies.

For example, say a board has 12 seats. If the board has the maximum number of members, or 12 members, a majority of the entire membership and a majority of the fixed membership would both be 7 members. However, if there are two vacancies (so that there are only 10 members on the board), then a majority of the entire membership would be 6 members (more than half of 10), but a majority of the fixed membership would still be 7 members.

"Majority of the members present" 
A "majority of the members present" means more than half of the members at the meeting. If 30 members were at a meeting, a majority of the members present would be 16. In any situation which specifies such a requirement for a vote, an abstention would have the same effect as a "no" vote.

A vote of a "majority of the members present" is not the same as a "majority vote". When unqualified, a "majority vote" is taken to mean more than half of the votes cast. If 30 members were at a meeting, but only 20 votes were cast, a majority vote would be 11 votes.

Common errors 
The expression "at least 50% +1" is sometimes used when "majority" is actually intended but this is incorrect when the total number referred to is odd. For example, say a board has 7 members. "Majority" means "at least 4" in this case (more than half of 7). But 50% + 1 is 4.5, and since a number of people can only be integer, "at least 50% + 1" would mean "at least 5".

See also 
 Majoritarianism
 Majority function
 Majority rule
 Silent majority
 Voting system

References 

 
Elections
Voting theory

yi:מערהייט